Austrocnemis obscura is a species of damselfly in the family Coenagrionidae,
commonly known as a Kimberley longlegs. 
It is a tiny damselfly, bronze-black in colour with very long legs.
It has only been recorded from the Kimberley region of Western Australia, where it inhabits streams and slow-moving water.

Gallery

See also
 List of Odonata species of Australia

References 

Coenagrionidae
Odonata of Australia
Insects of Australia
Endemic fauna of Australia
Taxa named by Günther Theischinger
Taxa named by J.A.L. (Tony) Watson
Insects described in 1991
Damselflies